Albert "Bert" James Norris (5 November 1898 – 11 June 1990) was an English long-distance runner who competed for Great Britain in the 1936 Summer Olympics.

He was born in Hanover Square, London and died in Wincanton, Somerset.

In 1936 he participated in the Olympic marathon event but did not finish the race.

At the 1934 British Empire Games he failed to finish the marathon competition. Four years later he won the silver medal in the marathon contest at the 1938 British Empire Games.

References
sports-reference.com

1898 births
1990 deaths
People from Wincanton
People from the City of Westminster
Athletes from London
English male marathon runners
Olympic athletes of Great Britain
Athletes (track and field) at the 1936 Summer Olympics
Commonwealth Games silver medallists for England
Commonwealth Games medallists in athletics
Athletes (track and field) at the 1934 British Empire Games
Athletes (track and field) at the 1938 British Empire Games
Medallists at the 1938 British Empire Games